SpaceX CRS-12, also known as SpX-12, was a Commercial Resupply Services mission to the International Space Station launched on 14 August 2017. The mission was contracted by NASA and was flown by SpaceX using a new Dragon capsule. The Falcon 9 rocket's reusable first stage performed a controlled landing on Landing Zone 1 (LZ1) at Cape Canaveral Air Force Station.

Mission overview

CRS-12 is the last of the original order of twelve missions awarded to SpaceX under the CRS contract. Originally scheduled for December 2016, the flight was delayed multiple times to August 2017. Launch occurred on 14 August 2017 at 16:31:37 UTC from Kennedy Space Center Launch Complex 39A aboard a SpaceX Falcon 9 rocket. After Dragon rendezvoused with the ISS on 16 August 2017, the station's Canadarm2 grappled the spacecraft at 10:52 UTC. It was then berthed to the Harmony module at 13:07 UTC.

Having been at the ISS for a month, the CRS-12 Dragon capsule was unberthed in the late hours of 16 September 2017 and was released by the Canadarm2 on 17 September at 08:40 UTC. After performing separation burns to take it out of the vicinity of the ISS, the Dragon performed a deorbit burn to enable atmospheric reentry.

Payload
NASA has contracted for the CRS-12 mission from SpaceX and therefore determines the primary payload, date/time of launch, and orbital parameters for the Dragon space capsule.

The following is a breakdown of cargo bound for the ISS:
 Science investigations: 
 Crew supplies: 
 Vehicle hardware: 
 Spacewalk equipment: 
 Computer resources: 
 External payloads:
 Cosmic-Ray Energetics and Mass (CREAM):

See also
Uncrewed spaceflights to the International Space Station
List of Falcon 9 and Falcon Heavy launches
2017 in spaceflight

References

External links
 
 Dragon website at SpaceX.com
 Commercial Resupply Services at NASA.gov

SpaceX Dragon
Spacecraft launched in 2017
Spacecraft which reentered in 2017
SpaceX payloads contracted by NASA
Supply vehicles for the International Space Station